Ghalilah is the name of a settlement in Ras Al Khaimah, in the United Arab Emirates (UAE). The location of a major desalination plant, Ghalilah also gives its name to the Wadi Ghalilah, the location of the  'Stairway to Heaven' hike.

References 

Populated places in the Emirate of Ras Al Khaimah